Pandula Ravindra Babu is an Indian politician and a member of parliament from Amalapuram (Lok Sabha constituency), Andhra Pradesh. He won the 2014 Indian general election being a Telugu Desam Party candidate. Born on 8 November 1955, he was an Officer of Indian Revenue Service till early 2014, when he resigned to contest Lok Sabha elections. He is a prolific speaker and takes a special interest in debating social issues.

Personal life 
Dr Ravindra Babu married Smt. Suneetha Ravindra Babu on 12 Jun 1985. He has two daughters. He worked as IRS officer before entering into politics. His elder daughter was a pilot and married to IAS officer of Orissa cadre .

Political career 
Dr Ravindra Babu elected to 16th Lok Sabha. At the Lok Sabha he was a member of the Committee on the Welfare of Scheduled Castes and Scheduled Tribes, Standing Committee on Petroleum and Natural Gas, Consultative Committee, Ministry of Petroleum and Natural Gas. He joined YSR Congress Party on 18 February 2019. YSR congress Party selected him for MLC under Governor quota in July 2020.

Controversies
MP Ravindrababu allegedly said that "people are joining the armed forces for free liquor, free meat and for free holidaying with family members."  His remarks kicked up a row nation-wide. In fact, AP CM N. Chandrababu Naidu sought an explanation from the MP. "I had earlier extended medical services to the Army personnel. I was misquoted. Mr Naidu was misinformed about my remarks," he said. Later MP has offered to tender an apology to the Indian Armed Forces personnel, if they felt slighted by his controversial remarks.

References

India MPs 2014–2019
Lok Sabha members from Andhra Pradesh
Living people
Indian Revenue Service officers
Telugu Desam Party politicians
People from East Godavari district
1955 births
Telugu politicians